Shamian Christian Church is a Protestant church located in Shamian, Liwan District of Guangzhou, Guangdong, China.

History
Shamian Christian Church was built by the Church of England in 1865 for British expatriates. It was located in the Shamian Guangzhou British Concession. After World War II, the Nationalist Government retracted the Concession and handed the church over to the South China Diocese of the Chung Hua Sheng Kung Hui, or Anglican Church in China.

After the founding of the Communist State in 1949, the local government took custody of the Shamian Christian Church. After the 3rd Plenary Session of the 11th Central Committee of the Communist Party of China in 1978, religious freedom was restored. In 1980, the Guangdong Committee of the Three-Self Patriotic Movement of the Protestant Church and Guangdong Christian Council took over its administration.  Services resumed in 1991.

Parish
The church has one Sunday Service at 9:30am on Sunday morning. The Weekday Meeting is at 19:30pm on Saturday.

References

Further reading
 

Churches in Guangzhou
Former Anglican churches in China
Tourist attractions in Guangzhou
1865 establishments in China
Protestant churches in China
Churches completed in 1865
Three-Self Patriotic Movement